Nawab Mirza Khan Daagh Dehlvi (25 May 1831 – 17 March 1905) was a poet known for his Urdu ghazals. He belonged to the old Delhi school of Urdu poetry.

He wrote romantic and sensuous poems and ghazals in simple and chaste Urdu, minimising usage of Persian words. He laid great emphasis on the Urdu idiom and its usage. He wrote under the takhallus (Urdu word for pen name) Daagh Dehlvi (the meanings of Daagh, an Urdu noun, include stain, grief and taint while Dehlvi means belonging to or from Dehli or Delhi). He belonged to the Delhi school of thought.

His honorific Dabeer ud Dawla, Faseeh ul Mulk, Nawab Nizam Jang Bahadur, Sipah Salar, Yar-e-Wafadar, Muqrib-us-Sultan, Bulbul-e-Hindustan, Jahan Ustad, Nazim Yar Jung, were the titles bestowed upon him by the sixth Nizam of Hyderabad Mir Mahbub Ali Khan.

Daagh was considered one of the best romantic poets of his time by some commentators.

Life

Early life
Dehlvi was born in Kucha Ustad Dagh, Chandni Chowk in Delhi to Nawab Shamsuddin Ahmed Khan, the ruler of Loharu and Ferozepur Jhirka and Wazir Khanum, daughter of a Delhi jeweller. Dehlvi's father was hanged under charges of conspiracy in the murder of William Fraser. Dehlvi at the age of four and his mother at age thirty four, the most sought after lady, wooed and remarried the Mughal crown prince, Mirza Muhammad Fakhroo, an heir to the last Mughal Bahadur Shah Zafar. Hence, Dehlvi had the privileged education at the Delhi Red Fort, There he received best of education and was later under tutelage of poet laureate, Mohammad Ibrahim Zauq. Later, he also took advise from Ghalib on finer nuances of Urdu literature and poetry. He was also trained in calligraphy and horse riding.

Literary life
Dehlvi belonged to the Dabistan-e-Dehli (Dehli school of thought) and never allowed western influences on his poetry. He started reciting poetry at the age of ten and his forte was the romantic version, the ghazal. He became popular for his poetry. Unlike the elitist style by the poets of the time, his style was simple and was well received by both, the common man and the elite.

After Fakhroo's death in 1856, Dehlvi along with his mother left Delhi after facing turbulent times, for Rampur State and came under the aegis of Nawab of Rampur, Yusuf Ali Khan Bahadur. He went into government service there and lived well for 24 years.

Later life in Hyderabad Deccan

Dehlvi stayed in Hyderabad in 1888 for several months. He left Hyderabad after not being invited to the court by the Mahbub Ali Khan, Asaf Jah VI's court, as access to his court was very limited. He then was invited immediately and was appointed as the court poet and mentor, in 1891, to the Sixth Nizam Mahbub Ali Khan, Asaf Jah VI, at the age of 60.

Contrary to the impression one gets from his poetry, he did not drink wine and shunned it.

His couplet on Urdu language was:

Death
He died in 1905 at the age of 74 in Hyderabad Deccan after a paralytic stroke. He was buried at Dargah Yousufain in Hyderabad.

Disciples
Dehlvi's students included Allama Iqbal, Hassan Raza Khan (1859-1908), Jigar Moradabadi (1890 – 1960), Seemab Akbarabadi and Ahasan Marharavi, though a widely quoted anecdote relates that when asked to designate his successor as the leading Urdu poet of his age, he replied Bekhudain [the two Bekhuds], referring to Bekhud Badayuni and Bekhud Dehlvi.

Popular ghazal songs
His selected ghazals are rendered by contemporary ghazal singers, Jagjit Singh, Noor Jahan, Iqbal Bano, Ghulam Ali, Adithya Srinivasan, Malika Pukhraj, Mehdi Hassan, Abida Parveen, Begum Akhtar, Pankaj Udhas and Farida Khanum.

Bibliography
His work consists of four volumes, consisting of 16,000 couplets and a masnavi. The last two volumes he wrote when he was in Hyderabad.

 Gulzar-e-Daagh (1878)
 Masnavi Fariyad-e-Daagh (1882)
 Aftab-e-Daagh (1885)
 Mahtab-e-Daagh (1893)
 Yaadgar-e-Daagh (posthumous, 1905)
 Diwan e Daagh
 Intikhab-e-Kalam Daagh (edited by Moinuddin Aqeel)

References

External links

Indian male poets
Urdu-language poets from India
19th-century Indian Muslims
Poets from Delhi
People from Rampur, Uttar Pradesh
1905 deaths
1831 births
Writers from Hyderabad, India
19th-century Indian poets
19th-century Indian male writers